Parkrose Heights is a neighborhood in the Northeast section of Portland, Oregon.

References

External links
 Guide to Parkrose Heights Neighborhood (PortlandNeighborhood.com)
Parkrose Heights Street Tree Inventory Report

Neighborhoods in Portland, Oregon